The Black Wolf is a 1917 silent film drama produced by Jesse L. Lasky, directed by Frank Reicher, starring Nell Shipman and Lou Tellegen, and distributed through Paramount Pictures.

Cast
Lou Tellegen - The Black Wolf
Nell Shipman - Dona Isabel
H. J. Herbert - Don Phillip
James Neill - Count Ramirez
Paul Weigel - Old Luis

References

External links
The Black Wolf at IMDb.com
AllMovie.com/synopsis

1917 films
American silent feature films
Films directed by Frank Reicher
Films based on short fiction
Paramount Pictures films
1917 drama films
Silent American drama films
American black-and-white films
1910s American films